Otto Donner (15 December 1835, Kokkola – 17 September 1909, Helsinki) was a Finnish linguist and politician.

Biography
He was professor of Sanskrit and Comparative Indo-European linguistics at the University of Helsinki, but also studied the Finno-Ugric languages. He was a member of the Diet of Finland 1877–1905, and minister of education 1905–1908. He was also influential in the founding of the Finno-Ugrian Society in 1883. He was elected as a member of the American Philosophical Society in 1886.

His mother tongue was Swedish, but he was a fennoman by conviction. He had many children: Ossian, Otto Jr., Uno, Kai, Harry and Eva Louise.

He is buried in the Hietaniemi Cemetery in Helsinki.

See also
Donner family
 Otto Donner in 375 humanists – 26 April 2015. Faculty of Arts, University of Helsinki.

Footnotes 

1835 births
1909 deaths
People from Kokkola
People from Vaasa Province (Grand Duchy of Finland)
Donner family
Finnish people of German descent
Young Finnish Party politicians
Finnish senators
Members of the Diet of Finland
Linguists from Finland
Academic staff of the University of Helsinki
Burials at Hietaniemi Cemetery

Members of the American Philosophical Society
Swedish-speaking Finns